Rhemaxos was an ancient king who ruled to the north of Danube around 200 BC and who was the protector of the Greek colonies in Dobruja, receiving a tribute from them in exchange of protection against outside attacks. It appears that the links with the Greek cities lasted a rather long time, as several treaties have been found.

Some historians have suggested that he was the chieftain of a Dacian tribal union on the Romanian Plain. Others said he was a Scythian king.

His son Phradmon allocated 600 horsemen to defend the city of Histria at the request of Agathocles, son of Antiphilos.

References

Dicţionar de istorie veche a României ("Dictionary of ancient Romanian history") (1976) Editura Ştiinţifică şi Enciclopedică, pp. 504

History of Dobruja
Dacian kings
Scythian rulers
3rd-century BC rulers